Fanshawe is a town in Latimer and Le Flore counties in the U.S. state of Oklahoma. As of the 2010 census, the town had a total population of 419. The Le Flore County portion of Fanshawe is part of the Fort Smith, Arkansas-Oklahoma Metropolitan Statistical Area.

History
A post office was established at Fanshawe, Indian Territory on March 31, 1891.  The town was named after John R. Fanshawe, an employee of the Choctaw, Oklahoma and Gulf Railroad, which built through the area in 1889–90; however, the town had no role in choosing the name.  Railroad executives and investors made an inspection trip on the newly-built line; at each designated station a name was drawn from a hat, and that name was used to designate the new town.  At the time of its founding, Fanshawe was located in the Moshulatubbee District of the Choctaw Nation.

Geography
Fanshawe is located at  (34.956756, -94.853433).

According to the United States Census Bureau, the town has a total area of 22.7 square miles (58.8 km2), of which 22.6 square miles (58.5 km2) is land and 0.1 square mile (0.3 km2) (0.57%) is water.

Demographics

As of the census of 2000, there were 384 people, 146 households, and 102 families residing in the town. The population density was 17.0 people per square mile (6.6/km2). There were 168 housing units at an average density of 7.4 per square mile (2.9/km2). The racial makeup of the town was 78.65% White, 17.97% Native American, 0.78% Asian, and 2.60% from two or more races. Hispanic or Latino of any race were 1.82% of the population.

There were 146 households, out of which 35.6% had children under the age of 18 living with them, 63.0% were married couples living together, 3.4% had a female householder with no husband present, and 30.1% were non-families. 28.1% of all households were made up of individuals, and 17.1% had someone living alone who was 65 years of age or older. The average household size was 2.63 and the average family size was 3.23.

In the town, the population was spread out, with 28.4% under the age of 18, 6.5% from 18 to 24, 26.6% from 25 to 44, 24.7% from 45 to 64, and 13.8% who were 65 years of age or older. The median age was 37 years. For every 100 females, there were 107.6 males. For every 100 females age 18 and over, there were 108.3 males.

The median income for a household in the town was $21,875, and the median income for a family was $30,000. Males had a median income of $29,286 versus $23,125 for females. The per capita income for the town was $20,583. About 26.3% of families and 29.2% of the population were below the poverty line, including 34.6% of those under age 18 and 16.2% of those age 65 or over.

References

External links
 Encyclopedia of Oklahoma History and Culture - Fanshawe
 Oklahoma Digital Maps: Digital Collections of Oklahoma and Indian Territory

Towns in Latimer County, Oklahoma
Towns in LeFlore County, Oklahoma
Towns in Oklahoma
Fort Smith metropolitan area